The List of railway routes in Baden-Württemberg provides a list of all railway routes in Baden-Württemberg, Germany. This includes Intercity-Express, Intercity, Interregio-Express, Regional-Express, Metropolexpress, Regionalbahn and S-Bahn services. The information is up to date to February 2021.

Regional services
The following Interregio-Express (IRE), Regional-Express (RE), Metropolexpress (MEX) and Regionalbahn (RB) services run through Baden-Württemberg:

Breisgau-S-Bahn

Rhine-Neckar S-Bahn

Stuttgart S-Bahn

Karlsruhe Stadtbahn

See also 
List of scheduled railway routes in Germany

References

External links 
kursbuch.bahn.de Timetables for all railway routes in Germany

Baden-Württemberg
Transport in Baden-Württemberg
Baden-Württemberg-related lists
Baden-Württemberg